Zero Day is the fourth studio album from nerdcore hip hop artist MC Frontalot. It was released on April 6, 2010. The first single, "Your Friend Wil", is available for free from the official website. The album's cover art was drawn by Jhonen Vasquez.

Track listing

Secret track
The album's last track ("Painstakingly Concealed Secret Track") is the key to a puzzle which leads to a hidden track. To congratulate the 56 fans who solved the puzzle before the album was officially released, a game ladder page was erected on the official website listing each fan's initials.

References

External links
 Official Zero Day web page with samples and lyrics

2010 albums
MC Frontalot albums